Nizhny Yenangsk is a rural locality (a selo) and the administrative center of Yenangskoye Rural Settlement, Kichmengsko-Gorodetsky District, Vologda Oblast, Russia. The population was 33 as of 2002. There are 11 streets.

Geography 
Nizhny Yenangsk is located 50 km east of Kichmengsky Gorodok (the district's administrative centre) by road. Rudnikovo is the nearest rural locality.

References 

Rural localities in Kichmengsko-Gorodetsky District